The Woodsboro and Frederick Turnpike Company Tollhouse is a historic toll house located at Walkersville, Frederick County, Maryland, United States. It is a two-story brick structure over a stone foundation, with a small interior end chimney at each gable end. It was used as a tollhouse by the Woodsboro and Frederick Turnpike Company.

The Woodsboro and Frederick Turnpike Company Tollhouse was listed on the National Register of Historic Places in 1979.

References

External links
, including photo from 2006, at Maryland Historical Trust

Transportation buildings and structures on the National Register of Historic Places in Maryland
Buildings and structures in Frederick County, Maryland
Houses completed in 1850
Infrastructure completed in 1850
National Register of Historic Places in Frederick County, Maryland
Toll houses on the National Register of Historic Places